LTX may refer to:
 LTX, an American semiconductor Automatic Test Equipment vendor
 Lithium Tokamak Experiment, the fusion experiment
 Cotopaxi International Airport, the IATA code LTX
 Latrotoxin, a high-molecular mass neurotoxin